Clifford Ronald Shows (born January 26, 1947) is an American educator and former Democratic member of the United States House of Representatives from Mississippi. He served two terms in  Congress from 1999 to 2003.

Biography 
Shows was born in Moselle, Mississippi. He attended Lawrence County Academy in Monticello. He graduated from Moselle High School and from the University of Southern Mississippi in 1971, earning degrees in education and political science. Shows worked as a teacher, before being elected as circuit clerk of Jefferson Davis County in 1976. From 1980 until 1988 he was a member of the Mississippi State Senate.

Congress 
Shows was elected to Congress in 1998 and represented Mississippi's 4th district from January 3, 1999 until January 3, 2003. In 2002, Shows was pitted against fellow Congressman Chip Pickering, a Republican from the neighboring 3rd District, after Mississippi lost a seat in the 2000 Congressional redistricting. Shows' Jackson-based district was dismantled and split between three neighboring districts.  The largest chunk, including his home in Bassfield, was placed in Pickering's district.  The new district heavily favored Pickering; notably, it was seven points whiter than Shows' old district and contained over 60 percent of Pickering's former territory.  Pickering soundly defeated Shows with over 60% of the vote in the new 3rd District.

In the 107th Congress, Shows introduced the Federal Marriage Amendment with 22 cosponsors and would have amended the U.S. Constitution to define marriage as legally between one man and one woman. The Amendment failed to advance in Congress.

Shows is a resident of Bassfield, Mississippi.

References

External links

1947 births
Living people
Democratic Party Mississippi state senators
University of Southern Mississippi alumni
Democratic Party members of the United States House of Representatives from Mississippi
People from Jones County, Mississippi
People from Jefferson Davis County, Mississippi
Schoolteachers from Mississippi
20th-century American politicians
21st-century American politicians

Members of Congress who became lobbyists